Berniceras is an extinct ammonite genus from the order Ammonitida that lived during the early Oxfordian stage of the Late Jurassic. Berniceras is included in the ammonite (sensu stricto) family, Oppeliidae.

Bernceras, which has been found in Europe, has a moderately enlarging, ribbed, involute shell with a keel along the venter, which forms the outer rim. The ribs are formed on the outer flanks and curve forward ventrally.

Distribution
Jurassic of France

References
Notes

Bibliography
 Arkell et al.,1957; Ammonitina in the Treatise on Invertebrate Paleontology, Part L, Ammonoidea; Geological Soc of America and Univ Kansas press.

Late Jurassic ammonites of Europe
Oxfordian life
Fossils of France